Howard County is a county in the state of Nebraska. As of the 2010 United States Census, the population was 6,274. Its county seat is St. Paul. The county was formed in 1871 and named after Civil War General Oliver Otis Howard.

Howard County is part of the Grand Island, NE Metropolitan Statistical Area.

In the Nebraska license plate system, Howard County is represented by the prefix 49 (it had the 49th-largest number of vehicles registered in the state when the license plate system was established in 1922).

Geography
The terrain of Howard consists of low rolling hills. The leveled hilltops are mostly used for agriculture. The Upper Loup River flows southeastward into the county near its NW corner, turning eastward to flow toward its junction with Middle Loup River. The Middle Loup River flows northeastward into the county near its SW corner, turning north to join with the Upper Loup River near the county midpoint to form the Loup River, flowing eastward into Merrick County.

Major highways

  U.S. Highway 281
  Nebraska Highway 11
  Nebraska Highway 22
  Nebraska Highway 58
  Nebraska Highway 92

Adjacent counties

 Merrick County – east
 Hall County – south
 Buffalo County – southwest
 Sherman County – west
 Greeley County – north

Protected areas
 Loup Junction State Wildlife Management Area

Demographics

As of the 2000 United States Census, there were 6,567 people, 2,546 households, and 1,797 families in the county. The population density was 12 people per square mile (4/km2). There were 2,782 housing units at an average density of 5 per square mile (2/km2). The racial makeup of the county was 98.69% White, 0.30% Black or African American, 0.24% Native American, 0.09% Asian, 0.03% Pacific Islander, 0.32% from other races, and 0.32% from two or more races. 1.01% of the population were Hispanic or Latino of any race.

There were 2,546 households, out of which 33.80% had children under the age of 18 living with them, 61.00% were married couples living together, 6.20% had a female householder with no husband present, and 29.40% were non-families. 26.00% of all households were made up of individuals, and 15.00% had someone living alone who was 65 years of age or older. The average household size was 2.56 and the average family size was 3.09.

The county population contained 28.30% under the age of 18, 6.60% from 18 to 24, 25.30% from 25 to 44, 22.60% from 45 to 64, and 17.10% who were 65 years of age or older. The median age was 38 years. For every 100 females, there were 101.00 males.  For every 100 females age 18 and over, there were 97.30 males.

The median income for a household in the county was $33,305, and the median income for a family was $40,259. Males had a median income of $27,270 versus $19,587 for females. The per capita income for the county was $15,535. About 8.50% of families and 11.70% of the population were below the poverty line, including 14.30% of those under age 18 and 15.00% of those age 65 or over.

Communities

City
 St. Paul (county seat)

Villages

 Cotesfield
 Cushing
 Dannebrog
 Elba
 Farwell
 Howard City
 Wolbach (part)

Census-designated place
 St. Libory

Unincorporated communities
 Dannevirke
 Nysted

Politics
Howard County voters have usually voted Republican for several decades. In only one national election since 1948 has the county selected the Democratic Party candidate.

See also
 National Register of Historic Places listings in Howard County, Nebraska

References

 
Nebraska counties
Grand Island micropolitan area
1871 establishments in Nebraska
Populated places established in 1871